Pavel Petrovich Chistyakov (5 July 1832, Prudy, Vesyegonsky Uyezd, Tver Governorate — 11 November 1919, Petrograd) was a Russian Imperial painter and art teacher; known for historical and genre scenes as well as portraits.

Biography 

His father was a freed serf who had worked as an estate manager. Despite the financial burdens, he saw to it that his son had a proper education; first at a parish school in Krasny Kholm, then the secondary school in Bezhetsk.

In 1849, he entered the Imperial Academy of Arts, where he studied with Pyotr Basin and Maxim Vorobiev. From 1854 to 1858, he received two silver medals and one gold, for his depiction of Hermogenes in prison. In 1861, he graduated with the title of "Artist", another gold medal (for his painting of Sophia of Lithuania at the wedding of her son, Vasily II) and the right to a stipend for study abroad. Before leaving, he taught for a short time at a preparatory school in Saint Petersburg.

In 1862, he headed for Germany, followed by lengthy visits to Paris and Rome. Upon returning in 1870, he was awarded the title of "Academician" for several works he had sent home.

After this time, he devoted himself primarily to teaching, first at the Imperial Society for the Encouragement of the Arts, then the academy, where he developed his own teaching methods which merged direct observation with scientific study. He rarely exhibited. His few works were mostly of an historical nature, which he attempted to infuse with a psychological depth, rather than merely representing the events.

He became an associate professor at the academy in 1872 and, following the reorganization of 1892, became a member of the academic council. From 1890 to 1912, he served as head of the Department of Mosaics and oversaw several mosaic projects; notably at the Cathedral of Christ the Saviour and Saint Isaac's Cathedral.

His wife Vera, daughter of the painter Yegor Meyer, was also an artist of some note. The street where he lived was named in his honor and, in 1987, his home in Pushkin (a suburb of Saint Petersburg) became a museum.

Notable pupils 

 Isaak Asknaziy
 Varvara Baruzdina
 Victor Borisov-Musatov
 Fyodor Buchholz
 Dmitry Kardovsky
 Kosta Khetagurov
 Nikolai Kuznetsov
 Yehuda Pen
 Vasily Polenov
 Yelena Polenova
 Ilya Repin
 Andrei Ryabushkin
 Nikolai Samokish
 Ivan Seleznyov
 Valentin Serov
 Dmitry Shcherbinovsky
 Vasily Smirnov
 Kazimierz Stabrowski
 Vasily Surikov
 Viktor Vasnetsov
 Mikhail Vrubel

Selected paintings

References

Further reading 
 Izabella Ginzburg, П. П. Чистяков и его педагогическая система (His Educational System), Искусство, 1940
 Olga Lyaskovskaya,  П. П. Чистяков, Tretyakov Gallery, 1950
 Чистяков П. П. Письма, записные книжки, воспоминания. 1832—1919. — М., 1953.
 Белютин Э., Молева Н. П. П. Чистяков — теоретик и пед (letters, notebooks, memoirs), 590pgs. Искусство, 1953
 Ely Bielutin and Nina Moleva, Павел Петрович Чистяков. теоретик и педагог (Theoretician and Pedagogue), Академии художесть, 1954.
 Yelena Churilova, "Я ещё могу съездить к Чистякову" (I Can Still go to Chistykov), Прана, 2004

External links 

 Biography and appreciation @ the Bezhetsk website.

1832 births
1919 deaths
People from Tver Oblast
People from Vesyegonsky Uyezd
19th-century painters from the Russian Empire
Russian male painters
20th-century Russian painters
Russian art directors
History painters
Russian genre painters
Russian portrait painters
19th-century male artists from the Russian Empire
20th-century Russian male artists